Stephanos Charalambous (born 3 September 1999) is a Cypriot footballer, who plays for Olympiakos Nicosia.

References

1999 births
Living people
Sportspeople from Limassol
Cypriot footballers
Cypriot First Division players
Olympiakos Nicosia players
Doxa Katokopias FC players
Association football defenders